Björnes magasin ("Björne's storage") was a Swedish children's TV program broadcast by SVT between 31 August 1987–29 August 2004. It was produced and created by Kerstin Hedberg and Anita Bäckström.

The idea likely came from the Danish children's TV program "Bamses Billedbog" (first broadcast on 16 September 1982 and still in production) and on that background you can call it the Swedish version of "Bamses Billedbog".

This program is about the teddy bear Björne, played by Jörgen Lantz (until 2001) and Pontus Gustafsson (from 2002). Other actors who have appeared as Björne's "guests" in the program include Robert Gustafsson, Eva Funck, Vanna Rosenberg, Anders Linder, Carl-Einar Häckner, Johan Ulveson and Anders Lundin. Together they often watch children's TV programs, which allowed the main programme to also function as a frame story.

In 2006 Björnes magasin and Hjärnkontoret were voted as the 2nd best children's TV program (after Fem myror är fler än fyra elefanter) on the SVT program Folktoppen.

See also 
Boktipset

References

External links 
 Björnes magasin on SVT Play 
 
 

1987 Swedish television series debuts
2004 Swedish television series endings
Swedish children's television series
Sveriges Television original programming
Television series about bears
1980s Swedish television series
1990s Swedish television series
2000s Swedish television series